Damon Marks is an American professional rock and roll guitarist, songwriter, record producer, and philanthropist. Marks is the founder of the Traveling Guitar Foundation, a non-profit that supplies underfunded school systems with support and musical instruments.
He is a spokesman for Merida Guitars and has performed with such artists as Alicia Keys and Bret Michaels.

Equipment 
Damon presently holds full artist endorsements with Schecter Guitar Research and EMG, Inc. Damon primarily uses the Schecter Banshee Elite-6 FR S with the new sustainiac supercharger pickup system and the Hellraiser Hybrid C-1 FR with EMG Pickups 57/66.

He also endorses the hand crafted Mérida Guitars DG15-SPGACES Diana Series Guitar and the T25-CES Trajan Series Nylon String Guitar.

Discography (with Lipstick Magazine) 
 Skin Deep – released August 5, 2008 via Nightmare Records
 Live in NYC – released April 28, 2008 via Lipstick Magazine
 "Skin Deep" – from Skin Deep, released 2008

Discography (with Livre') 
 Jericho: Tribe of Joshua - released May 20, 2016, via Sony Music Entertainment

Traveling Guitar Foundation 
In 2009, Damon founded the Traveling Guitar Foundation, a 501(c)(3) nonprofit organization that works to ensure that school children have access to high-quality musical instruments and instruction. By partnering with such sponsors as Schecter Guitars, Merida Guitars, and Blackstar Amplification, the foundation donates new instruments to underfunded schools nationally and internationally. By 2015, the foundation had equipped 70 schools and 30,000 students with musical equipment.

In early 2013, Damon went on his first celebrity USO tour.

On October 24, 2014, Marks was presented with a street sign at a ceremony by Mayor Christian Bollwage of the city of Elizabeth, NJ where he grew up.

On May 13, 2016, Marks was presented with a second street sign at a ceremony by Mayor Barbara McMorrow of the city of Freehold, NJ recognizing him for his contributions to the education of our children through his foundation. Marks was also presented with a proclamation that on Saturday May 15, 2016, being declared Damon Marks / Traveling Guitar Foundation day.

References

External links 
 
 
 Traveling Guitar Foundation sets groundwork for success via myCentralJersey.com

1971 births
Living people
20th-century American guitarists
20th-century American male musicians
21st-century American guitarists
21st-century American male musicians
American hard rock musicians
American heavy metal guitarists
American male guitarists
American male songwriters
American people of Italian descent
American philanthropists
American rhythm and blues guitarists
American rock guitarists
American rock songwriters
Guitarists from New Jersey
Lead guitarists
People from Elizabeth, New Jersey
Songwriters from New Jersey